Alejandro Víctor Mancuso (born 4 September 1968 in Ciudadela) is an Argentine former footballer who played as a midfielder. 

During his club career in Argentina he played for Ferro Carril Oeste, Club Atlético Vélez Sársfield, Boca Juniors and Club Atlético Independiente. He is one of the best friends of Alejandro Sabella.
After leaving his country, he played in Brazil, Spain and Uruguay. In 1996, he played for Flamengo where he won the Rio de Janeiro State Championship. Flamengo's supporters still remember his class and his courage in the matches.

In November 2008, Diego Armando Maradona was named coach of Argentina national football team and Mancuso joined him in the commission. He also said that after this cycle he intends to manage Flamengo.

Honours

Club
Flamengo
 Rio de Janeiro State Championship: 1996
 Copa de Oro Sudamericana: 1996

International
Argentina
CONMEBOL–UEFA Cup of Champions: 1993
Copa América: 1993

External links

 Argentine Primera statistics
Mancuso at Sambafoot

1968 births
Living people
Argentine people of Italian descent
Argentine footballers
Argentina international footballers
1994 FIFA World Cup players
1993 Copa América players
Ferro Carril Oeste footballers
Club Atlético Vélez Sarsfield footballers
Sociedade Esportiva Palmeiras players
CR Flamengo footballers
Club Atlético Independiente footballers
CD Badajoz players
C.A. Bella Vista players
Expatriate footballers in Brazil
Expatriate footballers in Uruguay
Argentine Primera División players
Argentine expatriate footballers
Argentine expatriate sportspeople in Brazil
Argentine expatriate sportspeople in Spain
Copa América-winning players

Association football midfielders
Sportspeople from Buenos Aires Province